The Fulton–Taylor House is a historic house located in The Dalles, Oregon, United States. Built and modified in phases between circa 1858 and circa 1930, this house is only one of a few remaining houses of similar age and style in The Dalles. James Fulton (in residence 1864 – 1881) emigrated to Oregon on the Oregon Trail, and eventually established himself as a cattle rancher, leader of the settler militia, and a state legislator. The Rev. O.D. Taylor (in residence 1891 – 1897) was a Baptist minister, but was far more noted as the driving force behind a major, failed, but long-running real estate scheme that was widely regarded as fraudulent.

The house was listed on the National Register of Historic Places.

See also
National Register of Historic Places listings in Wasco County, Oregon

References

External links

Houses completed in 1858
National Register of Historic Places in Wasco County, Oregon
Houses on the National Register of Historic Places in Oregon
Houses in The Dalles, Oregon
1858 establishments in Oregon Territory